Arjun Munda (born 3 May 1968) is an Indian politician. He is the current Minister of Tribal Affairs in the Second Modi ministry. He is a member of the  Bharatiya Janata Party. He was also Chief Minister of the Indian state of Jharkhand. He has also served as a member of parliament, having been elected to the 15th Lok Sabha from the Jamshedpur constituency in the 2009 parliamentary elections. The BJP's central leadership appointed him a National General Secretary of the party recognising his strong credentials as a popular mass leader and his significant contributions in strengthening the party in his state.

He lost his seat to Dashrath Gagrai of Jharkhand Mukti Morcha by 11,966 votes in Kharasawan in a 2014 state assembly election.

Early life
Arjun Munda was born on 3 May 1968 in Khrangajhar, Jamshedpur to a religious family of Ganesh and Saira Munda. After completing high school education in the Jamshedpur area, he graduated from Ranchi University and went on to earn a PG Diploma in Social Sciences from Indira Gandhi National Open University.

Political career
Munda began his political career in his teens during early 1980s when he joined the Jharkhand movement spearheaded by Jharkhand Mukti Morcha (JMM) which sought to create a separate state for tribals from the southern regions of Bihar. A believer in the welfare of indigenous people of his region, Munda felt passionate about the issue and took an active part in the movement. Soon his political influence grew due to his inclusive philosophy and he was elected to the Bihar Legislative Assembly from Kharsawan constituency in 1995 on a JMM ticket.

The National Democratic Alliance (NDA) strongly espoused the cause of Jharkhand and ran on a promise to create the state. Munda was attracted to the aspects of selfless nation building and sacrifice in the ideology of the Bharatiya Janata Party (BJP). He believed in its policy of championing the cause of Jharkhand and joined the BJP. He was elected again to the Bihar Assembly in 2000 elections on a BJP ticket from his old constituency of Kharsawan. After Jharkhand's formation, he was elected to the Jharkhand Assembly from the same constituency in 2005 and again in the 2011 by-election after assuming responsibility as the Chief Minister in September 2010.

When the NDA government came to power in 1999 under the leadership of Atal Bihari Vajpayee it kept its promise and created Jharkhand along with Uttarakhand and Chhattisgarh. Munda became the Tribal Welfare Minister in the 1st Babulal Marandi-led NDA coalition government of Jharkhand, which was carved out from Bihar on 15 November 2000. As welfare minister, he crafted many policies and programs to ameliorate a lot of the poor and downtrodden. His vision, his work ethic, and his performance matrix soon catapulted him to the top leadership grade and his popularity and support base soared meteorically. His inclusive philosophy and his commitment to Jharkhand's high growth and development made him chief minister in 2003 at the young age of 35 when he was chosen as the consensus candidate to lead the state in the aftermath of Babulal Marandi's divisive domicile policy.

He took the oath as union minister in Narendra Modi's second cabinet on 30 May 2019 and became the Minister of Tribal Affairs.

Major achievements
Arjun Munda defused the tension that was created due to the "Domicile movement" in 2001–2002 and insisted that every citizen of India had the fundamental right granted by the Indian Constitution to live and work in any part of the country.

During his tenure, Jharkhand got the 1st Lokayukta and the State successfully conducted the 34th National Games in 2011.

A 32-year-long jinx was broken when Jharkhand scripted history by conducting panchayat elections and empowered PRIs for participatory governance.

His government introduced an e-tender system in government contracts to bring transparency and efficiency and to provide equal opportunity in the procurement process.

He also took initiatives for setting up of new power plants with a view to making Jharkhand a power surplus state.

He introduced some of the famous welfare schemes and programs that were later emulated by other Indian states, such as:

Kanyadan Yojana: To provide assistance in solemnising marriages of girls from underprivileged classes.
Mukhya Mantri Ladli Laxmi Yojana: To promote welfare of girls born to a BPL family and APL families having an annual income of less than Rs. 72,000, her education and safe motherhood.
Aapka-cm: The Grievance Management System was established to enable people to communicate directly with their CM and voice their grievances to the State leadership for prompt consideration and redressal.
Mukhya Mantri Dal Bhat Yojna: To provide wholesome food and nutrition to the poorest sections of society.  Under this scheme, BPL families get dal, bhat and sabji for Rs 5 at railway stations, bus stands, hospitals and public places.
Free Laptop/Tablet: To prepare the youth to face challenges of the 21st century, tablets were to be given to students passing matriculation examinations under Yuwa Kaushal Vikas Scheme launched in 2013.

Personal life
An avid golfer, Munda is also interested in promoting archery at national and international levels. He plays flute and almost all tribal musical instruments widely used in the area. He has 3 sons.

A multi-linguist, he speaks English, Hindi, Bengali, Odia, and several tribal languages and dialects of the region like Santhali, Mundari, Ho, Oraon and others.

References

External links 

|-

|-

|-

|-

|-

1968 births
Living people
Chief Ministers of Jharkhand
Bharatiya Janata Party politicians from Jharkhand
Members of the Jharkhand Legislative Assembly
Jharkhand Mukti Morcha politicians
India MPs 2009–2014
Chief ministers from Bharatiya Janata Party
Lok Sabha members from Jharkhand
Leaders of the Opposition in Jharkhand
Jharkhand MLAs 2009–2014
People from Jamshedpur
India MPs 2019–present
Narendra Modi ministry
Ministers of Tribal Affairs (India)